"Kiss and Say Goodbye" is a 1976 song by American R&B vocal group The Manhattans. It was written by group member Winfred Lovett, the bass singer and songwriter of the group, who did the song's spoken introduction. The song was recorded for the album The Manhattans, released in 1976 by Columbia Records, and was released as a single in March of the same year. "Kiss and Say Goodbye" became a worldwide success, appearing in the musical charts of countless countries, a Top 10 hit in many countries, including No. 1 in the US, Belgium, Netherlands, New Zealand, and in Europe (European Hot 100 Singles). With the exception of Adult Contemporary Chart, "Kiss and Say Goodbye" was ranked number 1 in US on all Pop Singles Charts and on all R&B Singles Charts. The song was one of the biggest hits of 1976 and of the 1970s.

Background and recording
The song was written by Manhattans bass singer Winfred "Blue" Lovett, who also provided the spoken introduction heard in the full-length version of the original recording. The lyrics and melody came to him late one night. As he later recalled, "Everything was there. I got up about three o'clock in the morning and jotted down the things I wanted to say. I just put the words together on my tape recorder and little piano. I've always thought that when you write slow songs, they have to have meaning. In this case, it's the love triangle situation we've all been through. I figured anyone who's been in love could relate to it. And it seemed to touch home for a lot of folks."

Lovett originally considered the song a country tune more appropriate to be sung by Glen Campbell or Charley Pride. He decided to do it with his group. The Manhattans lead singer Gerald Alston is featured in the song starting to sing after Lovett's spoken introduction.

The original demo of the song was recorded with The Manhattans backing band, "Little Harlem." After hearing a tape of the recording, producer/arranger Bobby Martin decided to re-record the song with backing by MFSB at Sigma Sound Studios in Philadelphia. Recorded in early 1975, Columbia Records officials withheld releasing the song until 14 months later. Winfred "Blue" Lovett had his concerns over when the record came out as well as the record itself. "I was critical, a perfectionist in the studio, and there are still parts of it that make my skin crawl. For example, in one place, the background vocals go off pitch. Somehow, though, that didn't seem to bother anyone else."

Track listing

The full length of "Kiss and Say Goodbye" on the album The Manhattans is 4:28. The length of 3:29 on the 7" single is an edited version of the song. The Edited version fades out earlier, because it was considered too long and monotonous for airplay, while the full length version ends on a climatic cadenza on the song's title.

B-side
The B-side of the 7" single contains the song "Wonderful World of Love", which was also recorded by The Manhattans for the album The Manhattans. It was written by Robert S. Riley Sr., songwriter and producer/promotion man of the group, who wrote several songs (lyrics) for them. The song was produced by Bobby Martin and The Manhattans.

Chart performance
Released as a single, the song became a worldwide hit for the group, ranked number 1 on the US Billboard Hot 100 for two weeks, and also on the Billboard R&B chart for one week. The single reaching number 4 on the UK, (where received Silver certification), and number 7 on the Canada, (where received Gold certification). In the U.S., the song was the 400th #1 hit on the Billboard Hot 100. It also became just the second single to earn Platinum certification status, after the RIAA established the designation in 1976. (Johnnie Taylor's "Disco Lady" had been the first a few months earlier.) The single ultimately sold 2.5 million copies. Billboard ranked the song as the No. 6 Pop Singles for 1976 and No. 3 Soul Singles for 1976.

Besides being the first and only No. 1 pop hit for The Manhattans, "Kiss and Say Goodbye" marked 11 years since the group made their first appearance on the Billboard in 1965, with the song "I Wanna Be (Your Everything)" (No. 68 on the Hot 100). "Kiss and Say Goodbye" ended the decade at No. 83 on the Billboard Top 100 Songs of the 1970s.

Personnel
 Written by Winfred Lovett
 Arranged by Bobby Martin
 Spoken voice on intro – Winfred Lovett
 Lead vocal – Gerald Alston
 Music played (uncredited) – MFSB
 Background vocals (uncredited) – The Manhattans, Barbara Ingram, Evette Benton, Carla Benson

Credits
 Producer – Bobby Martin and The Manhattans
 Recording – Kenny Present
 Mastering – Stuart J. Romaine (SJR)
 Engineer – Kenny Present

Companies
Recorded at Sigma Sound Studios, Philadelphia, Pennsylvania
Pressed by Columbia Records Pressing Plant, Terre Haute
Mastered at Frankford/Wayne Mastering Labs

Charts

Weekly charts

Year-end charts

Decade-end charts

All-time charts

Certifications and sales

Other versions
 UB40 covered the song on their 2005 album Who You Fighting For?. Their version went to #19 on the UK singles chart.
 Joan Osborne included a version on her 2007 album Breakfast in Bed.
 Billy Joe Royal's rendition can be found on his 1989 album Tell It Like It Is.
 The song has also been covered by John Holt, Tierra and Alfred "Pee Wee" Ellis.
 The Singaporean band, Black Dog Bone  covered the song in Malay as "Hatiku Luka Lagi"(My Heart Hurts Again)
 The Mexican band Grupo Yndio covered the song in Spanish as Dame un beso y dime adiós.
This song was also covered on Czech language by Czech singer Karel Gott and actor Jiří Němeček in 1978 y.,the name of Czech version was "Teď už víš, že jsem to já" (You just already know that I am)

See also
List of Billboard Hot 100 number-one singles of 1976
List of number-one R&B singles of 1976 (U.S.)
List of Cash Box Top 100 number-one singles of 1976
List of Radio & Records number-one singles of the 1970s
List of European number-one hits of 1976
List of Dutch Top 40 number-one singles of 1976
List of number-one singles in 1976 (New Zealand)
List of Billboard Year-End Hot 100 singles of 1976
List of number-one singles and best-selling singles of 1976 (U.K.)

References

External links
 [ "Kiss and Say Goodbye" song review]. Allmusic.com.
 

1976 songs
1976 singles
The Manhattans songs
1970s ballads
European Hot 100 Singles number-one singles
Billboard Hot 100 number-one singles
Cashbox number-one singles
Number-one singles in Belgium
Number-one singles in New Zealand
Dutch Top 40 number-one singles
Soul ballads
Rhythm and blues ballads
Columbia Records singles
Songs about infidelity
Songs about parting
Songs about kissing